Mielczarek is a surname. Notable people with the surname include:

 Klemens Mielczarek (1920–2006), Polish actor
 Marcin Mielczarek (born 1982), Polish Paralympic athlete
 Ray Mielczarek (1946–2013), Welsh footballer

Polish-language surnames
Occupational surnames